The Trusthouse Forte Ladies' Classic was a women's professional golf tournament on the Ladies European Tour. In 1985 it was held at Club de Campo Villa de Madrid in Spain, and for 1986 it moved to Cologne in Germany.

Winners

Source:

References

External links
Ladies European Tour

Former Ladies European Tour events
Golf tournaments in Spain
Golf tournaments in Germany